Andrei Cristian Blejdea (born 22 June 1996) is a Romanian professional footballer who plays as a forward for Gloria Buzău. In his career, Blejdea also played for teams such as Eintracht Braunschweig II, Academica Clinceni, Pandurii Târgu Jiu,  
Argeș Pitești or Dinamo București, among others.

References

External links
 
 

1996 births
Living people
Footballers from Bucharest
Romanian footballers
Association football forwards
Romania youth international footballers
Swiss Challenge League players
FC Wil players
Slovenian PrvaLiga players
NK Domžale players
Regionalliga players
Eintracht Braunschweig II players
Liga I players
Liga II players
LPS HD Clinceni players
CS Pandurii Târgu Jiu players
FC Argeș Pitești players
FC Dinamo București players
FC Universitatea Cluj players
FC Hermannstadt players
FC Gloria Buzău players
Romanian expatriate footballers
Romanian expatriate sportspeople in Switzerland
Expatriate footballers in Switzerland
Romanian expatriate sportspeople in Slovenia
Expatriate footballers in Slovenia
Romanian expatriate sportspeople in Germany
Expatriate footballers in Germany